Phila Calder Nye (February 22, 1871 – ) was an American art historian. She was the first woman to be a full university professor at Princeton University.

Life 
Phila Calder Nye was born on February 22, 1871, in Wilmington, North Carolina.

She attended the Mount Vernon Seminary and College in Washington, D.C. from 1889 to 1891.

She was a professor at Princeton University. In 1920, she became director of the Index of Christian Art at Princeton. She retired in 1936.

Her work appeared in American Journal of Archaeology, Art Bulletin, Art in America, and Art & Archaeology.

Works 

 Art History in Outline, Washington, D.C.: Press of W.F. Roberts, 1901

Death and legacy 
She married Joseph Keith Nye. Phila Calder Nye died on 11 May 1959 in Wilmington, NC.

References 

Created via preloaddraft
1871 births
1959 deaths